"Kuma Hé" is the first single to be released from Flemish/Dutch girl group K3's seventh studio album Kuma Hé. It was written by Miquel Wiels,  A. Putte, P. Gillis, and produced by Studio 100. The song premiered in July 2005, it premiered on the kids TV channel Ketnet. The song became a huge summer hit in the Netherlands and Belgium. The song reached nr. 1 in the Netherlands and in Belgium nr. 2.

Music video
The video shows the girls dance in very colorful outfits in a kind of Africa vibe.

Charts

Weekly charts

Year-end charts

References

1 
2.

2009 singles
2009 songs